The Virgin Islands Coral Reef National Monument is a U.S. National Monument located off Saint John, Virgin Islands.

The clear waters surrounding Saint John support a diverse and complex system of coral reefs. The health of these reefs is closely tied to its component plants and animals as well as adjacent non-coral marine environments such as sandy bottoms, seagrass beds, and mangrove forests.

Seeking to provide greater protection to the sensitive coral reef resources, President Clinton established the Virgin Islands Coral Reef National Monument on January 17, 2001. The monument includes 12,708 acres (51 km2) of federal submerged lands within the 3 mile  (5 km) belt off Saint John, including Hurricane Hole and areas north and south of Saint John.

Ecosystem 

The coral reefs of the U.S. Virgin Islands suffered severely from coral bleaching in 2005, which led to a 60% decline in coral activity. The USGS began extensive research in the area and scientists discovered previously unknown coral ecosystems at the submerged stems of mangrove trees in the Hurricane Hole area of the National Monument. They found about 30 of the 45 coral species in the Virgin Islands, which is an astonishing diversity for the small area, and were surprised by the number of sponge species as well. This is the first known occurrence of corals in a mangrove ecosystem.

See also
Virgin Islands National Park
List of national monuments of the United States

References

External links 
 Official NPS website: Virgin Islands Coral Reef National Monument

National Park Service National Monuments in the United States Virgin Islands
Protected areas established in 2001
2001 establishments in the United States Virgin Islands
Saint John, U.S. Virgin Islands
Coral reefs of the United States